Craig Allen Dingman (born March 12, 1974) is a former relief pitcher in Major League Baseball. He batted and threw right-handed.

College career
Dingman attended Hutchinson Community College in Kansas.

Professional career
He was drafted by the New York Yankees in the 36th round of the  Major League Baseball draft and made his debut on June 30, . On March 30, he was traded to the Colorado Rockies for Jorge DePaula. From -, Dingman played in the Reds, Yankees, and Cubs organizations, and in Mexico.

Dingman signed with the Detroit Tigers organization as a minor league free agent before the start of the  season.

While playing catch with a teammate on February 4, however, his throwing hand spontaneously became pale and his arm lost all circulation from the elbow down.  After being placed on blood-thinning medication, he was diagnosed with a torn artery in his right shoulder, which led to arterial bypass surgery later that month. The operation removed an artery from his right and transplanted it into the injured shoulder, re-routing blood around the damaged vessel. It was the first procedure of its kind in the history of Major League Baseball.

He returned to the Detroit Tigers in early 2007 for testing on his throwing arm but suffered a blood clot and fatigue in his shoulder.  He was released by the Tigers   resulting in his final game being prior to his injury on 28 September 2005.

Private life 
Dingman was born in Wichita and in the off season lived there with wife Teresa and their 5 children.

Career after baseball 
Dingman had worked in the construction and roofing industry prior to his baseball career. He returned to working in the construction industry and in 2014 he joined with a partner in Wichita Kansas to start up a roofing construction company, Dingers Roofing & Construction.

References

External links

1974 births
Living people
Baseball players from Kansas
Major League Baseball pitchers
New York Yankees players
Colorado Rockies players
Toledo Mud Hens players
Detroit Tigers players
Gulf Coast Yankees players
Tampa Yankees players
Greensboro Bats players
Columbus Clippers players
Colorado Springs Sky Sox players
Louisville Bats players
West Tennessee Diamond Jaxx players
Iowa Cubs players